ByLock was a smartphone application that allowed users to communicate via a private, encrypted connection. It was launched in 2014 on Google Play, Apple App Store, BlackBerry OS, and Windows Phone. The app was downloaded over 600,000 times from its launch in April 2014 until March 2016, when it was permanently shut down. The Turkish National Intelligence Organization (MİT) stated that the app was downloaded mainly in Turkey, Saudi Arabia, and Iran.

According to the security certificate inside the software, the author of the application is David Keynes. In an interview with Hürriyet Daily News, Keynes stated that the developer of ByLock was a former flatmate of his, who had used Keynes' credit card to publish the app on the Apple App Store. Keynes also said that ByLock had not been available since January 2016.

Gülen Movement controversy 
In Turkey, possession of the app is deemed evidence of membership in the Gülen Movement, which was allegedly connected to the failed Turkish coup d'état attempt in July 2016. Users of ByLock were deemed terrorists in Turkish courts. According to Deutsche Welle, of the 215,000 former ByLock users, an estimated 23,000 have been detained by Turkish authorities. Some believe that the MİT and other Turkish authorities manipulated the ByLock database in order to arrest suspected members of the Gülen Movement.  Tuncay Besikci, a computer forensic expert in Turkey, emphasized that "the demands to investigate and analyze ByLock data from independent institutions is refused by the Turkish courts. But it is not normal". Tuncay Beşikçi believes that this application is precisely one of the channels for Gülen molecules to communicate and can also monitor the activities of other members of the organization. He also stated that the developers behind the Mor Beyin app, deliberately set a plan in motion that would put thousands of innocent people in prison as a cover for the Gülen movement.

In December 2017, Turkish authorities revealed that almost half the people who had been prosecuted for having ByLock on their smartphones would have their legal cases reviewed, as they could have been redirected to the app without their knowledge.

References 

Application software
Human rights abuses in Turkey
2016 Turkish coup d'état attempt
2014 software